The 25th Air Cavalry Brigade is a brigade of the Polish Armed Forces, headquartered in Tomaszów Mazowiecki. The brigade serves as air assault troops, enabling the formation to be transported to battle by helicopters in large numbers.

History
The 25th Air Cavalry Brigade was formed on June 15, 1994 as the 25th Air Cavalry Division, inheriting the traditions of the Mazowiecka Cavalry Brigade. It was not just traditions that were inherited from its predecessors, with the formation's role also intended to be similar to that of the old role of cavalry, which was now replaced by heli-borne troops instead of mounted troops. In September 1999, the 25th Air Cavalry Division was downsized and reformed into the 25th Air Cavalry Brigade.

Role
The brigade serves in an air assault role, where troops are transported to and then inserted into battle using helicopters. This enables the brigade to have a high degree of maneuverability, being able to be transported rapidly to strategic or tactical situations.

Structure

The brigade has 3500 soldiers and is structured as follows:

25th Air Cavalry Brigade in Tomaszów Mazowiecki
 25th Command Battalion in Tomaszów Mazowiecki
 1st Light Cavalry Battalion in Leźnica Wielka
 7th Uhlan Battalion in Tomaszów Mazowiecki
 1st Aviation Group in Leźnica Wielka
 1st Squadron with 16x Mi-8T transport helicopters
 2nd Squadron with 16x Mi-17-1V transport helicopters
 7th Aviation Group in Nowy Glinnik
 1st Squadron with 12x PZL W-3WA Sokół armed transport helicopters
 2nd Squadron with 12x PZL W-3WA Sokół armed transport helicopters
 Air Medical Evacuation Unit in Nowy Glinnik with 2x PZL W-3WA AE Sokół and 2x Mi-17AE medical evacuation helicopters
 25th Logistic Battalion in Tomaszów Mazowiecki

Gallery

See also
 6th Airborne Brigade

References

Military units and formations established in 1994
Army brigades of Poland
1994 establishments in Poland